George Arthur Skelhorn, also spelt Skelhorne ( – 15 April 1931) was an English professional rugby league footballer who played in the 1910s and 1920s. Skelhorn is an inductee in the Warrington Wolves Hall of Fame.

Skelhorn was selected to go on the 1920 Great Britain Lions tour of Australasia. He won caps for Great Britain while at Warrington in 1920 against Australia, New Zealand (3 matches), and in 1921-22 against Australia (3 matches).
Skelhorn won caps for England while at Warrington in 1921 against Australia, in 1922 against Wales, and in 1923 against Wales.

Arthur Skelhorn made his début for Warrington on Saturday 28 January 1911, and he played his last match for Warrington Saturday 21 March 1925.

Warrington Wolves announced heritage numbers for the club's players. All players who have represented the club at first-team level since the breakaway from the Rugby Football Union have been placed in chronological order, starting with the 15 Wirepullers who took to the field against Hunslet for their first match under Northern Union rules in September 1895. Arthur Skelhorn is listed at 176.

After retiring as a player, Skelhorn was elected as a member of the club's management committee. On 15 April 1931, he died of pneumonia, aged 43.

References

External links
Hall of Fame at Wire2Wolves.com
Statistics at wolvesplayers.thisiswarrington.co.uk
Arthur Skelhorn, the former…

1880s births
1931 deaths
England national rugby league team players
English rugby league players
Great Britain national rugby league team players
Lancashire rugby league team players
Rugby league players from Warrington
Rugby league props
Warrington Wolves players